Mayak is a nuclear fuel reprocessing plant.

Mayak (meaning "lighthouse" in Russian) may also refer to:

Radio Mayak, a Soviet/Russian radio station
Mayak (film), 2006
Maiac, an urban settlement in Transnistria
Mayak Shangina, a peak in Altai Krai
Mayak (rocket family), a proposed Ukrainian family of carrier rockets
Mayak (satellite), Russian amateur artificial satellite launched in 2017

See also
Mayak, Azerbaijan (disambiguation)